Wilhoit may refer to:

Wilhoit, Arizona, a community in the United States
Francis M. Wilhoit, American political scientist
James Wilhoit, American football player
Lisa Wilhoit, American actress on the television show My So-Called Life